Andrew James Penaflorida Wolff (born 13 July 1985) is a Rugby Sevens Player. Born in England, he currently plays for the Alabang Eagles Rugby Club and the Philippines' National Rugby Sevens Team, the Philippine Volcanoes.

Early life
Born in Shoreham-by-Sea, West Sussex, Wolff moved at a young age to Tunstall Green, Suffolk.  Wolff attended Eyke Primary School and Woodbridge School. After finishing his A-Levels in Mathematics, Physics, Chemistry, and A/S in Latin he gained a place at the University of Bristol to study Computer Systems Engineering in 2003. However, due to his disinterest in the degree, he left England in 2005 for the Philippines to be closer to his father, In 2013 Engr. Francisco Julao Vanguardia Jr. a former rugby league player (No.7 Flanker) became best friends ever since.

He is currently a student of the University of London International Programmes under the London School of Economics studying Accounting & Finance.

Rugby

2007–present: Philippine Volcanoes Rugby Sevens

In 2007 after learning about the Volcanoes first major 7s tournament at the 2007 Southeast Asian Games in Thailand later that year, Wolff's father, Barry Francis, contacted the Philippine Rugby Football Union via email and informed them that Andrew wanted to join the campaign.  Rick Hartley, former head coach, convinced by the email, decided to recruit Andrew and this was the start of Andrew's career with the national team.  The team went on to win a Silver Medal losing to Thailand 22 - 17 in the final.  Since then, Andrew has been the first choice prop and currently holds the record for the highest points in Philippine 7-a-side rugby.  He also holds the record for being the highest capped Filipino 7s player.

In 2008, Andrew played his first 15-a-side game for the Philippine Volcanoes against Brunei in Guam and then against Guam.  The Philippines won the series and the squad were promoted to division 3.  He was named man-of-the-match in both games.

In 2010, Andrew met his current business partner and Volcanoes team mate Chris Everingham, brother of Andrew Everingham (South Sydney Rabbitohs) from Australia. For the next 2 seasons, they played together oblivious to the fact that their mothers were friends in the early 80s in Manila, until one day Andrew's mother messaged Chris on Facebook and confirmed his identity.  Since then, Andrew and Chris have guested on numerous television shows and started an events management company together.

2011 was a difficult year for Andrew due to a number of injuries sustained in training.  He managed to fully recover the next year, but was not part of the squad that traveled to the prestigious Cathay Pacific Hong Kong 7s 2012.

In the latter part of 2012 Andrew scored four tries in the Singapore 7s tournament, including one in the final against South Korea, to help the Philippine Volcanoes qualify for the prestigious 2013 Rugby World Cup Sevens.  He was subsequently selected to play in Russia in 2013 and earned his first Rugby World Cup cap against Kenya on 28 June 2013.

Pageantry
He is crowned Mr. Philippines 2012 and represented the Philippines in Mister World 2012 in Kent, England on November 24, 2012.  He placed 1st Runner-Up.
The highest placement for the Philippines in Mister World.

Television 

In 1997, he appeared in the music video "Cry To be Found" for Scottish band Del Amitri.

During a visit to the Philippines in 2004, he was approached by agent, Robert Caindoc, of Monaco Models and within 2 weeks Wolff shot a six-country regional campaign for Modesse.  He then shot commercials for Axe and McDonald's.  Upon his return in 2005 Wolff endorsed many brands including Schick, Sunsilk, Lewis & Pearl, Century Tuna, Smart, Met-tathione and Bench

He has since endorsed Calcium-Cee, Nuvo hair, Greenwich Pizza, Globe Telecom and FILA.

In 2011, Wolff and fellow Philippine Volcanoes teammates Chris Everingham and Eric "Eruption" Tai perform a hip-hop dance production on Talentadong Pinoy, TV5 and won the episode.

Andrew has appeared in three Filipino Movies - Ang Tanging Ina 'Nyo, Praybeyt Benjamin and Moron 5.

He is currently the host of Yamaha SZ16 Adventure Challenge on Studio 23 in the Philippines.

Business 

Wolff is responsible for the incorporation of Optimum Market Strat International, Inc., a distribution company, in 2008. The company supplies vitamins and beauty products to numerous stores including Mercury Drug and Watsons.  He also set-up Secure Distribution Systems, Inc., which deals in beauty products and surplus merchandise.

In 2012, Wolff and majority shareholder Chris Everingham incorporated Event Logic, Inc., an events management and PR company.

References

External links
 Mister World Official Site
 Philippine Rugby Football Union Official Site

1985 births
Living people
People from Shoreham-by-Sea
Rugby union players from West Sussex
Filipino rugby union players
Philippines international rugby union players
English rugby union players
Filipino people of German descent
Filipino people of English descent
English people of Filipino descent
Filipino British sportspeople
Filipino beauty pageant winners
Rugby union players at the 2014 Asian Games
Southeast Asian Games gold medalists for the Philippines
Southeast Asian Games medalists in rugby union
Competitors at the 2007 Southeast Asian Games
Asian Games competitors for the Philippines
Rugby union wings